NodeOS is an operating system based on Linux (a Linux distribution) that is bundled with a NodeJS installation. It uses Npm as the default package manager.

References

External links 

 

Linux distributions